Prutskoy is a rural locality (a settlement) and the administrative center of Prutskoy Selsoviet, Pavlovsky District, Altai Krai, Russia. The population was 2,534 as of 2013. There are 15 streets.

Geography 
Prutskoy is located 25 km east of Pavlovsk (the district's administrative centre) by road. Urozhayny is the nearest rural locality.

References 

Rural localities in Pavlovsky District, Altai Krai